NGC 450 is a spiral galaxy located in the constellation Cetus. It was discovered in 1785 by William Herschel. NGC 450 has a very close companion, UGC 807 (or PGC 4545), which is attached at the northeast side of the halo. UGC 807 appears fairly faint, fairly small, and elongated. Despite that UGC 807 appears to form a double system, the companion has a redshift that is over six times greater than NGC 450, so they are a line-of-sight pair.

References

External links 
 

Galaxies discovered in 1785
Cetus
0450
806
4540
Spiral galaxies
Overlapping galaxies